Francesco Gabriele may refer to:

Francesco Gabriele (director)
Francesco Gabriele (football manager)
Francesco Gabriele (rower)